Gar Ab (also Romanized as Gar Āb) is a village in Bala Taleqan Rural District, in the Central District of Taleqan County, Alborz Province, Iran. As of the 2006 census, its population was 142, in 40 families.

References 

Populated places in Taleqan County